Ernst Pittschau (5 October 1883 – 2 June 1951) was a German stage and film actor.

Biography
Pittschau, whose father's name was also named Ernst Pittschau, a stage actor, received an education in business and had a brief career selling dental products.  However, he then chose his father's profession and had his first theatrical engagement at the end of 1905 in Koblenz.

In 1910, he appeared in New York City, and in 1911, he was a stage actor in Berlin.  A year later, he took roles in the still undervalued cinema.  Pittschau personified elegant lovers and was a partner of Hanni Weisse and Henny Porten, among others.

In the 20s, his film roles became smaller; after that, he barely received work. He now mostly played at the Theater am Kurfürstendamm, at the Komödie and at the Tribüne.  In the 1940s, he lived in poverty and had to rely on the support of the Goebbels-supported foundation for people who worked in the arts, "Künstlerdank."

After World War II, the Italian director Roberto Rossellini brought the almost forgotten actor in front of the camera again.  In the survival drama Germany, Year Zero (1948), he played the bedridden father.

His half-brother was the stage and film actor Werner Pittschau (1902-1928) who died in a car crash.

Selected filmography

 Zofia - Kriegs-Irrfahrten eines Kindes (1915)
 Schlemihl (1915) - Bodo
 Die Schaffnerin der Linie 6 (1915)
 Die silberne Kugel (1916) - Mitglied des Gaunerquartetts
 Der Fall Klerk (1916) - Direktor Hansen
 Hoffmanns Erzählungen (1916)
 The Grehn Case (1916) - Professor Herkdal
 Wer wirft den ersten Stein auf sie? (1916)
 Gaugräfin Fifi (1916)
 Vengeance Is Mine (1916)
 Lux, der Spürhund von Stradford (1916)
 Das Geheimnis der Diamantenfelder (1916)
 Der Fall Routt...! (1917) - Astronom Brown
 Aus Liebe gefehlt (1917)
 Des Goldes Fluch (1917) - Zuchthäusler Phil. Graf
 The Picture of Dorian Gray (1917) - Herzog Henry Wotton
 Königliche Bettler (1917)
 Die verschlossene Tür (1917) - Hetford
 Seltsame Menschen (1917)
 Lumpengrete (1917)
 Durchlaucht amüsiert sich (1917)
 Das Verhängnis einer Nacht (1917)
 Robin Morris (1918) - James Walker
 Der Weg ins Freie (1918)
 Let There Be Light (1918, part 2, 3)
 Das Kainzeichen (1918) - Jacob Jensen
 Die seltsame Geschichte des Baron Torelli (1918) - Baron Pansa
 Mr. Wu (1918) - Lord Chiltren
 Pique Dame (1918) - Narumoff
 Die Singende Hand (1918) - Gonzaga
 Die Heimatlosen (1918) - Oswald Harro
 Der Volontär (1918)
 Des Vaters Schuld (1918)
 Die tolle Heirat von Laló (1918)
 Die Tänzerin Adina (1918) - von Stoll
 The Story of Dida Ibsen (1918) - Eken Kornils
 Zwischen Tod und Leben (1919) - Franz
 Treu der Jugend (1919) - Assessor Horst
 Different from the Others (1919) - Brother-in-Law
 Stiefkinder des Glücks (1919) - Erwin von Eben
 The Lady in the Car (1919) - Jens Lofthus - Mankier
 Verschleppt (1919) - Cyrus Golden
 Gepeitscht (1919)
 Zwischen neun und neun (1919) - Karl Marwitz
 The Devil and the Madonna (1919) - Graf Jervis
 Verlorene Töchter (1919) - Gärtner Franz
 Sein letzter Trick (1919) - Sportsmann
 Fieber (1919)
 Die Toten kehren wieder - Enoch Arden (1919) - Fred Carlston
 Die Törichte Jungfrau (1919)
 Die Ehe aus Haß (1919) - Staatsanwalt Hansen
 Der Terministenklub (1919) - Felix Leander
 Der Saal der sieben Sünden (1919) - Redfern
 Der Kampf um die Ehe (1919, part 1, 2) - Detektiv
 Der Harlekin (1919) - Fabrikant Rolf Ringstett
 Der Fall Tolstikoff (1919) - Kapellmeister Büttner
 Das Schicksal der Maria Keith (1919) - Bernhard von Gellwitz, ihr Sohn
 Der Doppelmord von Sarajewo (1920) - Graf Harrach
 Getäuscht (1920) - Kurt von Sassen
 Können Gedanken töten? (1920)
 Um der Liebe Willen (1920)
 Wenn Colombine winkt (1920)
 The Rose of Stamboul (1920) - Baron Rangen
 The Woman in the Dolphin (1920) - Harold Holm
 Schatten einer Stunde (1920)
 Der Meisterschuß (1920)
 Dämmernde Nächte (1920) - Baron von Bonais
 Unter der Dornenkrone - Mexikos Kaisertragödie (1921) - Oberst Lopez
 Opfer der Liebe (1921)
 Der Mann im Schrank (1921)
 Schuld oder Schein (1921)
 You Are the Life (1921)
 Das Geheimnis der Santa Margherita (1921)
 Cocain (1921)
 Im Kampf mit dem unsichtbaren Feind (1922) - Herr aus dem Sanatorium
 The Five Frankfurters (1922) - Wellington
 Lucrezia Borgia (1922) - Manfredo
 Lola Montez, the King's Dancer (1922) - Studiosus Peisner
 Circus People (1922)
 Die Heimatlosen (1923)
 The Second Shot (1923)
 Die Radio Heirat (1924)
 Ash Wednesday (1925)
 Reveille: The Great Awakening (1925)
 Nameless Heroes (1925, Short)
 The Adventures of Captain Hasswell (1925) - von Berkhof
 Lena Warnstetten (1925)
 The Proud Silence (1925)
 Watch on the Rhine (1926)
 Ich hatt' einen Kameraden (1926)
 The Beaver Coat (1928)
 Trust of Thieves (1929) - Wikipedia
 Rag Ball (1930)
 Der Liebesarzt (1931)
 A Waltz by Strauss (1931) - Der Bräutigam
 Victoria and Her Hussar (1931) - Sekretär
 Die Zaubergeige (1944)
 Junge Adler (1944)
 Die Degenhardts (1944)
 Die Affäre Rödern (1944)
 Philharmoniker (1944)
 Germany, Year Zero (1948) - Il padre (final film role)

Bibliography
 Bondanella, Peter E. The Films of Roberto Rossellini. Cambridge University Press, 1993.
 Gottlieb, Sidney.  Roberto Rossellini's Rome Open City. Cambridge University Press, 2004.

External links

1883 births
1951 deaths
German male film actors
German male silent film actors
German male stage actors
People from Altona, Hamburg
Male actors from Hamburg
20th-century German male actors